Cliff Robinson is a British comic book artist, probably best known for his cover work on 2000 AD, and contributions to the Judge Dredd strip.

Biography
Clifford Robinson was raised in Gorleston-on-Sea, Norfolk, England.

Robinson has an extremely precise inking style which is extremely well suited to producing detailed, composed single images for cover art.  But his strip work has also been praised highly by, among others, Gordon Rennie.  This excerpt from a 2004 interview demonstrates the regard in which Robinson’s art is held by the 2000 AD writers:

Robinson’s strip work outside Judge Dredd has been quite limited, though he did create the strip Mother Earth with Bernie Jaye.

Bibliography

Judge Dredd:
 "Block Rite" ( with John Wagner and Alan Grant as T.B. Grover, in "2000AD" #489, 1986)
 "A Real Xmas Story" ( with John Wagner and Alan Grant, in "2000AD" #502, 1986)
 "First of the Many" (with Garth Ennis and Gina Hart, in 2000 AD #775, 1992)
 Mother Earth (with co-authors Paul Neary and Jaye, in 2000 AD #867-872, 1993)
Vector 13:
 "Case Three:  Graven Images" (with John Smith, in 2000 AD #1064, 1997)
 "Case Eleven: Search & Rescue" (with Gordon Rennie, in 2000 AD #1072, 1997)
 "Divine Fury" (with Lee Marks, in 2000 AD #1117, 1998)
Pulp Sci-Fi:
 "Eggs is Eggs" (with Mike Carey, in 2000 AD #1145, 1999)
 "War of Words" (with Robbie Morrison, in 2000 AD #1159, 1999)
 Terror Tales: "Futurity" (with Arthur Wyatt, in 2000 AD #1599, 2008)

Notes

References

Cliff Robinson at 2000 AD online

External links
Cliff Robinson's blog

British comics artists
Living people
Year of birth missing (living people)